Christopher Brocklebank-Fowler (13 January 1934 – 29 May 2020) was a British politician. In 1981, he defected to the Social Democratic Party (SDP), the only Conservative Member of Parliament to do so. He then joined the Liberal Democrats, followed by Labour, thereby being a member of four political parties within 15 years.

Early life and education
Brocklebank-Fowler was born on 13 January 1934 as the second son of the solicitor Sidney Brocklebank-Fowler and his wife Iris Beechey. He attended primary school on the west coast of Scotland before moving to be educated at The Perse School in Cambridge. He later studied for a diploma in agriculture at the University of Oxford.

He served his National Service in the Royal Navy on submarines and later worked on a farm in Kenya. He was also employed by Unilever and as an advertising consultant before his election to Parliament.

Parliamentary career
After unsuccessfully contesting West Ham North in 1964, Brocklebank-Fowler entered Parliament as a Conservative at the 1970 general election, representing the constituency of King's Lynn. This seat was abolished at the February 1974 general election, and Brocklebank-Fowler was elected for the new North West Norfolk seat.

He was re-elected in the 1979 general election with a majority of 7,928.

In 1981 Brocklebank-Fowler defected to the Social Democratic Party (SDP), crossing the floor during a parliamentary debate on the budget. In the House of Commons he represented the SDP  on agriculture and overseas development issues. However, at the 1983 general election the Conservatives regained North West Norfolk with a majority of over 3,000. Brocklebank-Fowler contested the seat again at the 1987 general election, but lost by a much wider margin.

Later career
After the SDP's merger with the Liberal Party to form the Liberal Democrats, Brocklebank-Fowler contested the South Norfolk constituency at the 1992 general election, but once again finished second. In 1996 he joined the Labour Party, saying that he was prompted by Tony Blair's "determination to pursue constitutional reform, efficient economic management, and fairer social provision which alone can restore One Nation".

Personal life
Brocklebank-Fowler was married three times. With his first wife, Joan Nowland, whom he married in 1957, he had two sons.

He later moved to Thurso, Scotland, where he restored a fishery on the Forss Water. He died on 29 May 2020.

References

Bibliography
Who's Who 2003 (A&C Black Ltd.)

External links 
 

1934 births
2020 deaths
Conservative Party (UK) MPs for English constituencies
Members of the Bow Group
Social Democratic Party (UK) MPs for English constituencies
UK MPs 1970–1974
UK MPs 1974
UK MPs 1974–1979
UK MPs 1979–1983
Labour Party (UK) politicians
Liberal Democrats (UK) parliamentary candidates
People educated at The Perse School
Alumni of the University of Oxford
Unilever people